Benjamin Franklin Millard (May 5, 1850January 27, 1926) was an American businessman, politician, and pioneer of Alaska and Washington.  He was the 21st mayor of Chippewa Falls, Wisconsin, and represented Chippewa County in the Wisconsin State Assembly during the 1889 session.

Biography
Benjamin F. Millard was born on May 5, 1850, in Baraboo, Wisconsin.  As a child, he moved with his father to Minnesota, then to Menomonie, Wisconsin, in 1858, before finally settling at Chippewa Falls, Wisconsin, in 1861.  He came from an impoverished background and went to work in the logging camps around Chippewa Falls.

He was able to become a majority owner of the Chippewa Falls Woolen and Linen Mills, and owned a number of greenhouses.  He was active with the Republican Party of Wisconsin, and was elected to the Chippewa Falls city council and the Chippewa County board of supervisors.  In 1888, he was elected to the Wisconsin State Assembly and served in the 1889 session of the Legislature.  He was defeated running for re-election 1890.  In 1892, however, he was elected mayor of Chippewa Falls, and served a one-year term.

In 1898, he moved to the District of Alaska.  There, he organized the Galena Bay Mining Company and purchased a stake in the Bonanza Copper Mine of Alaska.  He also owned or part-owned several other mining companies, including the Cliff and Granite Gold Mines.

Later in life, he relocated to Seattle, Washington, where he died in 1926.

Personal life and family
Millard married four times.  He was survived by two children and his fourth wife.

Electoral history

Wisconsin Assembly (1888, 1890)

| colspan="6" style="text-align:center;background-color: #e9e9e9;"| General Election, November 6, 1888

| colspan="6" style="text-align:center;background-color: #e9e9e9;"| General Election, November 4, 1890

References

1850 births
1926 deaths
People from Baraboo, Wisconsin
Politicians from Chippewa Falls, Wisconsin
People from Valdez, Alaska
People from Seattle
Republican Party members of the Wisconsin State Assembly
Mayors of places in Wisconsin
19th-century American politicians